The periodic table is a tabular arrangement of the chemical elements.

Periodic table may also refer to:
 The Periodic Table (short story collection), by Primo Levi, 1975
 The Periodic Table (Basher book), a 2007 children's science book
 Periodic table (crystal structure), a variant of the periodic table of chemical elements
 Periodic table (electron configurations), a variant of the periodic table of chemical elements

See also
 
 Alternative periodic tables
 Extended periodic table
 Periodic table of topological invariants